During the 1995–96 FA Premier League season, English club Newcastle United participated in the Premier League, finishing in second place.

Season summary
The 1995–96 season saw Sir John Hall's millions allow Newcastle to invest heavily in players from across the world. With a total of some £16 million spent on the signings of Les Ferdinand, David Ginola, Warren Barton and Shaka Hislop before the start of the season, Kevin Keegan's team made a strong start. Colombian striker Faustino Asprilla and England midfielder David Batty were also attracted to the north-east in February 1996 for a combined total of around £11 million.

An explosive start to the season saw Newcastle storm to the top of the Premier League table. Newcastle led the league for virtually all of the season from August until mid-March, and by Christmas had established a 10-point lead over Manchester United. Though they lost 2–0 at Old Trafford on 27 December, they still managed to extend this lead to 12 points on 20 January 1996, putting them in prime position for the title with 15 matches remaining. However, Manchester United – bolstered by the return of Eric Cantona from suspension – then enjoyed a surge in form. Despite an emphatic 2–1 win at Middlesbrough largely inspired by debutant Faustino Asprilla, Newcastle lost five of their next eight. Newcastle dropped vital points away to West Ham and Manchester City, whilst a 1–0 win for Alex Ferguson's team at St James' Park on 4 March ended Newcastle's 100% home record in the league and cut their lead to a single point, and further away defeats at Arsenal, Liverpool and Blackburn Rovers allowed Manchester United to overtake them and establish a lead that would ultimately prove decisive. 

Ferguson's mind games added further heat to the title race and provoked an infamous rant from Keegan live on Sky Sports on 29 April 1996, following his team's 1–0 win at Leeds United. A 1–1 draw at Nottingham Forest three days later left Newcastle needing to beat Tottenham Hotspur, and Manchester United needing to lose against Middlesbrough, if the title was to return to Tyneside for the first time since 1927. In the end, a 1–1 draw proved academic as Manchester United beat the Teessiders 3–0, thus winning by four points. Newcastle's second place finish was nonetheless their highest finish for 69 years.

Analysis
The contest between Newcastle United and Manchester United for the Premier League title in the 1995–96 season has been described by Total Football magazine as "an absolute classic." In 2012, the season was one of six nominees for the Premier League 20 Seasons Award for the best Premier League season ever. 

The 4-3 loss to Liverpool was voted the greatest game of the first decade of the Premier League at the Premier League 10 Seasons Awards, attributing to the jubilant celebrations at Anfield whilst Keegan slumped over the advertising hoardings in distress. 

Newcastle's collapse in the Premier League title race has been the subject of continuous debate. Newcastle's performance has been described by Graham Lister of Goal.com as having "entered football folklore as the Premier League's ultimate Devon Loch moment." Rob Lee claimed that the failure to capture the title was due to falling player confidence, whilst Ian Cusack believed that the return of Eric Cantona was the major difference, stating "Newcastle United had, player for player, the best team in the Premiership, but didn’t have the best player." Mark Lawrenson said the general consensus was Keegan's attacking philosophy having been instrumental in costing Newcastle the title, stating "I really think they should have won the league in the 1995–96 season...Kevin could have done it if he'd altered the system very, very slightly. But he didn't want to betray his principles...I think Kevin wanted it free-flowing in all departments and that doesn't necessarily happen."

Final league table

Kit
Newcastle United's kit was manufactured by the company Adidas and sponsored by Tyneside-based brewery Newcastle Brown Ale.

Players

First-team squad
Squad at end of season

Left club during season

Reserves
The following players did not appear for the first-team this season.

Appearances, goals and cards
Starts + substitute appearances)

Coaching staff

Matches

Pre-season

Premier League

FA Cup

League Cup

External links
FootballSquads – Newcastle United – 1995/96
Newcastle United Football Club – Fixtures 1995–96
Transfers (Keegan) – Senior / Reserve Arrivals & Departures
The Great career – Profile
Player Index – premierleague.com
Season Details – 1995–96 – toon1892

References

Newcastle United
Newcastle United F.C. seasons